Carlo Chiostri (5 May 1863, in Florence – 9 July 1939, in Florence) was a self-taught  Italian painter and graphic artist, best known for being one of the earliest illustrators for the book version of The Adventures of Pinocchio.

Biography
He began working as an illustrator in the 1890s, primarily for the publishing houses of Adriano Salani Editore,  and Casa Editrice Nerbini. His drawings for Pinocchio were done in pen and watercolor, then engraved on wood. His designs for Ciondolino (1896) by Vamba, were made into etchings which were then "restituiti all'eleganza e alla grazia dell'originale" (returned to the elegance and grace of the original).

He illustrated the works of many other well-known authors, including Luigi Capuana, Emma Perodi, Emilio Salgari and Alberto Cioci (1867–1925), who wrote a sequel to Pinocchio called Lucignolo, l'amico di Pinocchio (Candlewick, Pinocchio's Friend). He also created drawings for Les Misérables by Victor Hugo, and the complete works of Tommaso Catani, a priest and friend of Carlo Collodi, who wrote children's books and elementary school readers. For many years, he was a contributor to Il giornalino della Domenica. The Journey of a Lead Soldier, written by Anna Franchi and published by Salani in 1901, met with considerable success. In 1910, he wrote Il falco e la colomba: melanconie d'un Gatto bigio (The Falcon and the Dove: Melancholy of a Gray Cat). Later, he designed postcards.

Federico Fellini had this to say about Pinocchio and Chiostri:
"I loved this story as a child, of course, very much, but I like it even today. I sat quite sunk dreaming about it, staring at the melancholy, ghostly shapes of Carlo Chiostri. They underlined also the sad side of this book, its taste of the bad dream, that fever sick trembling."

References

Further reading
 Antonio Faeti, Guardare le figure. Gli illustratori italiani dei libri per l'infanzia, Donzelli, 2011 
 Paolo Pallottino, C'era una volta un mago. Carlo Chiostri, Volume 6 of Cento anni di illustratori, Cappelli editore, 1979
 Valentino Baldacci, Andrea Rauch,  Pinocchio e la sua immagine, Giunti-Marzocco, 2006

External links

Carlo Chiostri, self-portrait @ Cultura Italia
Postcards and related items by Chiostri @ Delcampe.
Arcadja Auctions: More works by Chiostri.
Melusina Mermaid (blog) "The Art-Deco Mermaids of Carlo Chiostri"
 

Italian cartoonists
1863 births
1939 deaths
Italian children's book illustrators
Postcard artists
Artists from Florence
Magazine illustrators